Musics is an album by American jazz saxophonist Dewey Redman featuring performances recorded in 1978 for the Galaxy label.

Reception

AllMusic reviewer Scott Yanow awarded the album 4½ stars stating "This is one of tenor-saxophonist Dewey Redman's more accessible sessions... The music is excellent although not as explorative as most of Redman's other recordings".

Track listing
All compositions by Dewey Redman except where noted.
 "Need to Be" – 10:11 
 "The Virgin Strike March" – 5:35 
 "Alone Again (Naturally)" (Gilbert O'Sullivan) – 6:19 
 "Unknown Tongue" – 9:06 
 "One Beautiful Day" – 5:36 
 "Daystar Nightlight" – 6:04
Recorded at Fantasy Studios in Berkeley, California on October 17–19, 1978

Personnel
Dewey Redman – tenor saxophone, musette, vocals, harp
Fred Simmons – piano, cowbell
Mark Helias – bass
Eddie Moore – drums, saw, percussion, vocals

References

Galaxy Records albums
Dewey Redman albums
1979 albums